The West of Scotland Junior Challenge Cup was an annual Scottish football competition played in a one-leg knockout format (played at 'home' team grounds as drawn, until the final at a neutral venue), organised by the West Region of the Scottish Junior Football Association.

After the entire West Region joined the senior pyramid structure in 2020, a new league competition was started, the West of Scotland League, and with it the new West of Scotland League Cup.

History
The tournament has its origins in the Intermediate dispute of the 1920s, in which most of the leading Junior clubs in the west of Scotland left the Scottish Junior Football Association and formed their own Scottish Intermediate Football Association in 1927, which organised new leagues and cups similar to those run by the SJFA, including the Scottish Intermediate Cup as a replication of the flagship Junior competition, the Scottish Junior Cup. The dispute was resolved in 1931, the rebel clubs rejoined the SJFA and the competitions were continued, with the Scottish Intermediate Cup re-designated the West of Scotland Cup, below the Scottish Cup in the hierarchy. Initially it was open only to the clubs which had been in the intermediates (the historic Glasgow League, now replaced by the Central League, and the Western League in northern Ayrshire which had existed both before and after the dispute) but by 1949 this had been extended to other clubs which had joined those leagues – notably a group in southern Ayrshire – and those in the Lanarkshire League which had continued during the dispute, with a total of 82 clubs entering the 1949–50 edition. The format has remained almost unchanged since, with mergers in the leagues (Lanarkshire joining Central in 1968, and Central and Ayrshire merging as West Region in 2002) not affecting involvement in the West Cup.

From 2003 until 2012, the winners qualified for the Evening Times Cup Winners Cup along with the other league and cup winners in the region (this thereafter changed to a 'Champions Cup' format for league divisional winners only).

The current (2019) holders are Beith Juniors who defeated Kirkintilloch Rob Roy in a Penalty shoot-out (association football) at the final played at Meadow Park in Irvine; Beith were also finalists in 2018, losing on penalties to Hurlford United at the same venue.

The Junior competition should not be confused with the West Of Scotland Amateur Cup operated by the Scottish Amateur Football Association, encompassing a similar geographical area and occupying a similar prominence below the Scottish Amateur Cup, nor with a West of Scotland Cup for Under-21 teams operated by the Scottish Youth FA.

Finals 

 (R) = Won after a replay/2nd replay.
 (aet) = Result after extra time.
 (P) = Won on penalties. 

 Notes

Club Performance

 Notes

References

External links
Results and Fixtures at Scottish Junior Football Association

1931 establishments in Scotland
2020 disestablishments in Scotland
Defunct football cup competitions in Scotland
Scottish Junior Football Association, West Region
Annual sporting events in the United Kingdom
Annual events in Scotland
Recurring sporting events established in 1932
Recurring sporting events disestablished in 2020